The Latin American Confederation of Workers (CLAT), was the World Confederation of Labour's (WCL) regional organization for Latin America and the Caribbean. The WCL merged with the International Confederation of Free Trade Unions in 2006, and in 2008, CLAT merged with the ICFTU Inter American Regional Organisation of Workers to form the Trade Union Confederation of the Americas.

References

World Confederation of Labour
Trade unions established in 1954
Trade unions disestablished in 2008